Dorylomorpha clavifemora is a species of fly in the family Pipunculidae.

Distribution
Great Britain, Czech Republic, Finland, Hungary, Latvia, Norway, Sweden.

References

Pipunculidae
Insects described in 1966
Diptera of Europe